Rosine Wallez (born 28 April 1957) is a Belgian sprinter. She competed in the 400 metres at the 1976 Summer Olympics and the 1980 Summer Olympics. Wallez also shares in the 4 × 400 metres relay national record, set with Lea Alaerts, Anne Michel and Regine Berg at the 1980 Moscow Olympics.

References

1957 births
Living people
Athletes (track and field) at the 1976 Summer Olympics
Athletes (track and field) at the 1980 Summer Olympics
Belgian female sprinters
Olympic athletes of Belgium
Place of birth missing (living people)
Olympic female sprinters